Central Football  is one of seven federations of New Zealand Football, representing regions of Taranaki, Whanganui, Manawatū, Hawke's Bay and Gisborne.

History 
While New Zealand Football is the governing body, unlike other sports in New Zealand, the funding model for football means each seven regional federations look after football in their area themselves, only following New Zealand Football's plan as they see fit. For the local federations, the clubs fund the federation with the rest of the money coming from Sport New Zealand funding and about three per cent from New Zealand Football.

The region has also provided a women's representative team for the New Zealand Women's National League from its inaugural season in 2002 onwards.

Board Members 
As of 2022.
Jamie Hall (Chairperson)
Gary Mackenzie (Deputy Chair)
Kerry Donovan
Rod Pelosi 
Garret Blair
Rori Moore 
John Sigurdsson      
Rachel Ingram

Competitions
 Central League
 Central Federation League
 Capital Football W-League

Note: Central League includes teams from the Capital Football Federation and is a lower North Island competition managed by Capital Football.

Affiliated clubs
As of 2022.

See also 

 Association football in New Zealand
 Auckland Football Federation
 Northern Football Federation
 Waikato/Bay of Plenty Football
 Central Football
 Mainland Football
 Football South

References

External links 

 Central Football - official site

Association football in New Zealand
1890 establishments in New Zealand